Variations sérieuses, Op. 54, is a composition for solo piano by Felix Mendelssohn consisting of a theme in D minor and 17 variations. It was completed on 4 June 1841.  A typical performance lasts about eleven minutes.

The work was written as part of a campaign to raise funds for the erection of a large bronze statue of Ludwig van Beethoven in his home town of Bonn.  The publisher Pietro Mechetti asked Mendelssohn to contribute to a 'Beethoven Album', published in January 1842, which also included pieces by Liszt, Chopin, Moscheles and others, of which the proceeds would go to the Monument. (Schumann's Fantasie in C was the final result of a work originally intended for the same purpose).

Mendelssohn is known to have written three sets of piano variations, but only this one was published during his lifetime.

Many of the variations require a virtuoso technique. Mendelssohn's good friend Ignaz Moscheles stated "I play the Variations sérieuses again and again, each time I enjoy the beauty again." Ferruccio Busoni also liked the work very much. Many pianists have recorded it, including Vladimir Horowitz, Sviatoslav Richter, Alicia de Larrocha, Vladimir Sofronitsky and Murray Perahia.

Structure

 Theme: Andante sostenuto
 Variation 1
 Variation 2: Un poco più animato
 Variation 3: Più animato
 Variation 4
 Variation 5: Agitato
 Variation 6: A tempo
 Variation 7: Con fuoco
 Variation 8: Allegro vivace
 Variation 9
 Variation 10: Moderato
 Variation 11: Cantabile
 Variation 12: Tempo del Tema
 Variation 13: Sempre assai leggiero
 Variation 14: Adagio
 Variation 15: Poco a poco più agitato
 Variation 16: Allegro vivace
 Variation 17
 Coda: Presto

References

External links
 

Compositions by Felix Mendelssohn
Compositions for solo piano
Variations
1841 compositions
Compositions in D minor